The 1983 Scottish Cup Final was played on 21 May 1983 at Hampden Park in Glasgow and was the final of the 108th Scottish Cup. Aberdeen and Rangers contested the match, Aberdeen won the match 1–0, thanks to Eric Black's extra time goal. Aberdeen had already won the Cup Winners' Cup ten days earlier, making the Scottish Cup their second trophy of the season.

Match details

Road to the final

Media Coverage 

In Scotland the Scottish Cup Final was shown live on BBC One Scotland on their Sportscene programme and also on STV and Grampian Television on Scotsport. Live radio commentary was on BBC Radio Scotland

References

See also
 Aberdeen F.C.–Rangers F.C. rivalry

1983
Cup Final
Aberdeen F.C. matches
Rangers F.C. matches
20th century in Glasgow
May 1983 sports events in the United Kingdom